Radio and Television of Montenegro (abbr. /RTCG) is the public service broadcaster of Montenegro. A state-owned company with its headquarters in Podgorica, it is made up of the Radio of Montenegro (RCG) and the Television of Montenegro (TVCG). In July 2001, RTCG became a joint member of the European Broadcasting Union (EBU). It became a full member of the EBU upon the declaration of Montenegrin independence in 2006.

History
The first radio station in the Balkans and South-East Europe was established in Montenegro with the opening of a transmitter situated on the hill of Volujica near Bar by Knjaz Nikola I Petrović-Njegoš (1841–1921) on 3 August 1904. Radio Cetinje commenced broadcasts on 27 November 1944 and in 1949, Radio Titograd was formed. In 1990 it changed its name to Radio Crna Gora.

In 1957, the first TV antenna was placed on Mount Lovćen. It was able to receive pictures from Italy.
RTV Titograd was established in 1963 to produce original television programmes. RTV Titograd later became RTCG. The first broadcast by TVCG in Belgrade was a news program in 1964.

Since October 2002, RTCG has been a member of the EGTA, European Group of Television Advertising.

Management 

RTCG is regulated by the Law on Public Radio-Diffusion Services, requiring it to serve the interests of all Montenegro citizen, regardless of their political, religious, culture, racial or gender affiliation.

RTCG is managed by a Council of 9 members, who are experts proposed by civil society organisations and appointed by the Parliament by simple majority. The RTCG Council appoints the Director General of the RTCG and advocates in the public interest. Although its nomination procedure should ensure the independence of the Council, the fact that some of the nominating organisations receive state funding has led the OSCE and the Council of Europe to express concern about their lack of independence from the government coalition.

RTCG is widely seen as dependent from the Government, particularly after allegedly politically motivated dismissals of journalists in 2011.
RTCG does not pay a broadcasting licence fee and is financed directly from the State budget (1,2% of the budget) as well as from advertising revenues (for a limited airtime) and sales revenues. Its finances have been in trouble lately, and it edged bankruptcy in 2012, further endangering its independence credentials. RTCG's financial viability is often at risk and relies heavily on the government as its primary source of funding. RTCG's debt stock (€2.4 million) was covered by the state budget in 2014.

Channels
RTCG has four TV channels: three terrestrial, one international; it also has two radio stations.

TV
TVCG 1 – News and domestic production.
TVCG 2 – Sport, entertainment.
TVCG 3 – Live broadcasts from the Parliament of Montenegro and other government institutions.
TVCG MNE – RTCG international channel via satellite.

Radio
Radio Crne Gore – generalist
Radio 98 – youth-oriented

References

External links
 

Television stations in Montenegro
Publicly funded broadcasters
Multilingual broadcasters
Radio stations established in 1949
Television channels and stations established in 1964
Mass media in Podgorica
1949 establishments in Montenegro
State media